Xavier 'Xavi' Ginard Torres (born 11 October 1986) is a Spanish professional footballer who plays for CD Atlético Baleares as a goalkeeper.

Club career
Born in Artà, Balearic Islands, Ginard was a youth product of FC Barcelona's La Masia. He made his debut as a senior with CE Felanitx in the 2005–06 season, in Tercera División.

Ginard moved to fellow league club CE Manacor in June 2006, and first arrived in Segunda División B in 2009 after agreeing to a deal at CE Sabadell FC. After acting as a backup to David de Navas during the campaign he returned to the fourth tier, signing for CE Campos.

On 2 August 2011, Ginard joined CD Atlético Baleares in division three. Initially playing second-fiddle to Biel Ribas and Ian Mackay in his first two years, he was an undisputed starter in his third, appearing in 30 matches as a captain and being also awarded the Ricardo Zamora Trophy for the category.

On 28 May 2014, Ginard moved abroad for the first time in his career, signing a two-year contract with Super League Greece side Veria FC. He played his first match as a professional on 24 September, starting in a 4–1 home win against A.E. Ermionida F.C. in the second round of the Greek Football Cup. In the following stage of the same competition, he kept a clean sheet in a 2–0 away victory over Ergotelis FC.

Ginard made his league debut on 7 February 2015, in a 1–1 home draw to Atromitos FC. After countryman Jonathan López's return in the summer he was deemed surplus to requirements, and his contract was mutually terminated.

Career statistics

Club

References

External links

1986 births
Living people
Spanish footballers
Footballers from Mallorca
Association football goalkeepers
Segunda División B players
Tercera División players
CD Binissalem players
CE Sabadell FC footballers
CD Atlético Baleares footballers
UE Olot players
Super League Greece players
Veria F.C. players
Aris Thessaloniki F.C. players
Spanish expatriate footballers
Expatriate footballers in Greece
Spanish expatriate sportspeople in Greece